Truant (styled as truANT)  is the third studio album by American rock band Alien Ant Farm. It was released on August 19, 2003 by DreamWorks Records. The producers of the album were Stone Temple Pilots' guitarist and bassist Robert DeLeo and Dean DeLeo. "These Days" was released to radio on July 1, 2003. "Glow" was released to radio on September 9, 2003.

The music video for track "These Days" was filmed on a roof top across the street from the Kodak Theatre in Los Angeles. The surprise video shoot was shot during the 2003 BET Awards while numerous hip hop artists and rappers were arriving on the red carpet before the awards show. The video catches the reaction from many artists, including Nelly, Snoop Dogg, and Lil' Kim.

The album art is based on the classic Pee Chee brand school folder, featuring the faces of the band members.

Reception

Truant was met with generally favourable reviews from music critics. At Metacritic, the album received an average score of 63, based on ten reviews.

"These Days" appeared on several Billboard component charts: number 17 on Active rock, number 29 on Alternative Airplay, number 38 on Mainstream Rock Songs, and number 40 on Heritage Rock.

Track listing

Personnel
Alien Ant Farm
Dryden Mitchell-		vocals, acoustic guitar, veracruz
Terry Corso-		lead guitar, backing vocals
Mike Cosgrove-		drums
Tye Zamora-		bass, kalimba, backing vocals, piano
DeLeo Brothers (Robert and Dean) - Producers
Brendan O'Brien-		Mixing
Otmaro Ruíz-		Piano
David Schiffman-		Engineer
David Campbell-		String Arrangements
John Wittenberg-		Violin
Suzie Katayama-		Cello, Leader, Contractor
Andrew Scheps-		Trumpet, Engineer, Digital Editing
Norm Hughes-		Violin
Eve Butler-		Violin
Mark Robertson-		Violin
Dan Smith-		Cello
Tamara Linder-		Art Direction, Design
Seth Waldman-		Assistant
Steve Rosenblatt-		Production Coordination
Jair Neciosup-		Vocals (Background)
Reiss Chunyan-		Triangle
Darius Campo-		Violin
Lenny Castro-		Percussion
Larry Corbett-		Cello
Robert DeLeo-		Organ, Vocals (Background)
Joel Derouin-		Violin
Peter Kent-		Violin
Bob Ludwig-		Mastering

Charts

References

External links

Truant at YouTube (streamed copy where licensed)

Alien Ant Farm albums
2003 albums
Albums produced by Dean DeLeo
DreamWorks Records albums
Albums produced by Robert DeLeo